Semagystia agilis is a moth in the family Cossidae. It was described by Hugo Theodor Christoph in 1884. It is found in Uzbekistan, Turkmenistan, Afghanistan and Iran.

References

Arctiidae genus list. Butterflies and Moths of the World. Natural History Museum, London.

Cossinae
Moths described in 1884